The BFF U-18 Football Tournament is a youth club football tournament in Bangladesh founded in 2014 that are managed, organized and controlled by the Bangladesh Football Federation (BFF).

History
The tournament was established in 2014, in order for Bangladesh Premier League (BPL) clubs to develop young players. With each team playing in the BPL during that specific season fielded their U18 players. The first three editions saw clubs split into a group of four, while the top two out of the three teams in the group advancing to the Quarter-Finals. After the first edition of the league in 2014, the Bangladesh Football Federation (BFF) did not arrange the tournament again until 2018.

Tournament's summaries

Top goalscorers by edition

Controversies 
During the 2019 BFF U-18 Football Tournament, Saidu Alias Ramiz from Chittagong Abahani Limited U-18 team w 
was found guilty of age fraud, his team was therefore disqualified. Age fraud has been a constant issue during the tenure of the tournament, the federation thus made it mandatory for clubs to provide MRI test results before participating.

See also
BFF U-18 Football League

References

Football cup competitions in Bangladesh
Sports leagues established in 2014
Youth football in Bangladesh